Cooperativa Agrícola y Lechera de La Unión Limitada (COLUN or Colún) is a Chilean dairy cooperative company based in La Unión, Chile. As of 2011, Colún is the second largest dairy company in Chile after New Zealand owned Soprole.

References

 Las claves del expectante momento lechero. 17 January 2011. Revista Campo, El Mercurio.

External links
 COLUN's official site

Companies based in Los Ríos Region
Food and drink companies established in 1949
Drink companies of Chile
Dairy products companies of Chile
Chilean companies established in 1949